This is a list of association football clubs in China.

Chinese Super League

2022 Teams
Beijing  Guoan, Beijing
Cangzhou Mighty Lions, Cangzhou
Changchun Yatai, Changchun
Chengdu Rongcheng, Chengdu
Chongqing Liangjiang Athletic, Chongqing
Guangzhou F.C., Guangzhou
Guangzhou City, Guangzhou
Hebei F.C., Qinhuangdao
Henan Songshan Longmen, Zhengzhou
Meizhou Hakka, Wuhua
Shandong Taishan, Jinan
Shanghai  Shenhua, Shanghai
Shanghai Port, Shanghai
Shenzhen F.C., Shenzhen
Tianjin Jinmen Tiger, Tianjin
Wuhan F.C., Wuhan
Wuhan Three Towns, Wuhan
Zhejiang FC, Zhejiang

China League One

2022 season
 Beijing BSU, Beijing
 Dalian Pro, Dalian
 Guangxi Pingguo Haliao, Pingguo
 Guizhou F.C., Guiyang
 Hebei Kungfu, Hebei
 Heilongjiang Ice City,  Harbin
 Jiangxi Beidamen, Ruichang
 Kunshan F.C., Kunshan
 Liaoning Shenyang Urban, Shenyang
 Nanjing City, Nanjing
 Nantong Zhiyun, Rugao
 Qingdao F.C. Qingdao
 Qingdao Hainiu, Qingdao
 Qingdao Youth Island, Qingdao
 Shaanxi Chang'an Athletic, Xi'an
 Sichuan Jiuniu, Chengdu
 Suzhou Dongwu, Suzhou
 Zibo Cuju, Zibo

China League Two

2022 season
 Beijing BIT, Beijing
 Dandong Tengyue, Dandong
 Dongguan United, Dongguan
 Hebei Zhuoao, Shijiazhuang
 Hubei Huachuang, Wuhan
 Hubei Istar, Wuhan
 Hunan Billows, Changsha
 Inner Mongolia Caoshangfei, Baotou
 Jiangsu Zhongnan Codion, Nantong
 Jiangxi Dark Horse Junior, Yichun
 Jinan Xingzhou, Jinan
 Kunming Zheng He Shipman, Kunming
 Lingshui Dingli Jingcheng, Lingshui
 Qingdao Red Lions, Laixi
 Shanxi Longjin, Taiyuan
 Shanghai Jiading Huilong, Shanghai
 Sichuan Minzu, Chengdu
 Tai'an Huawei, Tai'an
 Wuxi Wugou, Wuxi
 Xiamen Egret Island, Xiamen
 Xi'an Wolves, Xi'an
 Xinjiang Tianshan Leopard, Urumqi
 Yanbian Longding, Longding

Other Professional/Semi-Professional Football Clubs

China Amateur Football League
Bank of Dalian Tornado
Baotou Lucheng Caoshangfei
Changchun RCB Fengyun
Changchun Subway
Changchun Guanghua University
Changzhou Tianshan
Daqing Donghu
Fujian Joyou
Guangxi Liuzhoushi Liuyue
Hangzhou Zhipu
Hangzhou Sinobal
Jiaozhou Fengfa Anji Tower
Qingdao Kunpeng
Shanghai Boji Shizheng
Shantou Lions
Shenyang Riverside Garden
Shenzhen Yinwu
Wuhan Dongfeng Honda
Wuhan Chufengheli
Wuhan Huachuang
Xiamen Dongyuping
Yanbian Longjing Financial

China Collegiate Football League
Tongji University

Other
Beijing Youth
Beijing Yicheng BTV Sangao
Beijing Yitong Kuche
Chongqing Youth
Dongguan Nancheng PTT Lubricant
Guangdong Sports Lottery Youth
Hebei Youth
Hubei Youth
Jiangsu Hohai University
Liaoning Zhongba
Nanjing Baotai
Qingdao Haisha
Qingdao Liming
Qinghai Youth
Shaanxi Daqin Leephick
Shandong Youth
Shanghai Pudong Zobon
Shanxi Jiayi
Shenzhen Yihua Jewellery
Shijiazhuang Tiangong
Sichuan FC
Tianjin Dongli
Vanguard Hubei Police Academy FC
Xinjiang Lottery
Xinjiang Xiyu Grand Begonia

Defunct Football Clubs
Anhui Jiufang
Bayi Football Team
Beijing Bus
Beijing Hongdeng
Dalian Chanjoy
Dalian Shide
Dalian Transcendence
Fujian Ningde Funing
Gansu Tianma
Guangdong South China Tiger
Guangdong Hongyuan
Guangxi Tianji
Guangzhou Baiyunshan
Guangzhou Matsunichi (Guangzhou Songri)
Hohhot Black Horse
Jiangsu F.C.
Lhasa Urban Construction Investment
Liaoning F.C.
Shanghai Shenxin
Shenzhen Pengcheng
Sichuan Longfor
Hubei Wuhan Professional (Wuhan Optics Valley, Wuhan Guanggu)
Nanjing Yoyo
Qingdao Hailifeng
Shaanxi Guoli
Shanghai United
Shanghai JuJu Sports
Shanghai Sunfun
Shenyang Dongjin
Shenzhen Ledman
Sichuan Guancheng
Suzhou Trips
Taizhou Yuanda
Tianjin Tianhai
Wuhan Yaqi
Xiamen Blue Lions (Xiamen Lanshi)
Yanbian Beiguo
Yanbian Funde
Yinchuan Helanshan F.C.
Yunnan Hongta
Yunnan Lijiang Dongba
Zhanjiang Tiandi No.1
Zhenjiang Groupway

See also
List of football clubs in Taiwan
List of football clubs in Hong Kong
List of football clubs in Macau